Sydney (Syd) Victor Colville (22 March 1894 – 1966) was an Australian broadcast pioneer who, in 1914, established the Wireless Institute of Queensland. He was one of the first amateur radio operators in Australia.

References 
 
radio museum entry on Colville

1894 births
1966 deaths
Place of birth missing
Date of death missing
Place of death missing
Australian broadcasters